Joshua Seymour Sasse (born 9 December 1987) is a British actor. He is known for playing Sir Galavant in ABC's Galavant.

Early life
Sasse was born in Westminster, England to poet Dominic Sasse and Mary Rosalind Macauley. He has an older sister, Lydia Sasse. He was raised Catholic, and has Irish, Welsh, Scottish, and Jewish ancestry.

His maternal great-grandfather was William Berry, 1st Viscount Camrose, and his maternal great-uncles were Seymour Berry, 2nd Viscount Camrose and Michael Berry, Baron Hartwell. His father died when Joshua was aged 5 on PIA Flight 268, whilst he was travelling to Kathmandu; his mother subsequently remarried, and Joshua was sent to Shrewsbury School, where he discovered his love for acting.

Career
Sasse studied performing arts at Hurtwood House College and later at Cygnet Training Theatre in Exeter. His first major role was on the British gangster film, The Big I Am in 2010.

In the mid-2010, Joshua took over the role of Sky in the West End production of Mamma Mia! at the Prince of Wales Theatre, London.

In March 2012, he was cast in a big budget horror film titled Frankenstein's Army. In April 2013, he was cast in the TV series, Rogue. He had a recurring role on the show which lasted for two series and 13 episodes.

In December 2013, he was cast in Dan Fogelman's fairy tale-themed musical comedy pilot, Galavant. The pilot was shot in London due to the UK's new tax credit for high-end television shows. He was also cast in a recurring role on Fogelman's award-winning comedy, The Neighbors as DJ Jazzy Jeff.

In May 2014, Galavant was picked to series and premiered on 4 January 2015. The second season premiered on 3 January 2016.

In 2016, he was selected to co-star in The CW's series No Tomorrow.

Personal life
Sasse was previously either in a relationship or married to Francesca Cini with whom he has a son named Sebastian (born circa 2013). On 20 February 2016, Sasse's engagement to Australian singer Kylie Minogue was announced in the "Forthcoming Marriages" section of The Daily Telegraph. In February 2017, Minogue confirmed the couple had ended their relationship. 

Sasse married Louisa Ainsworth in 2018.

Filmography

Film

Television

References

External links

1987 births
Living people
English male film actors
English male musical theatre actors
English male television actors
21st-century English male actors